V: The Doctrine Decoded is the fifth studio album released by the Swedish progressive metal band, Loch Vostok. The album was released worldwide on 4 October 2012, which coincided with the "European Progressive Assault" tour where the band opened for Leprous, together with Persefone, and Ørkenkjøtt.

The album was recorded, engineered, produced, and mixed at Blueflame Productions in Sweden, and mastered by Lawrence Mackrory at Great Scot! Audio. It received overall good reviews.

Track listing

Personnel
Teddy Möller – vocals, guitar
Niklas Kupper – guitar, vocals
Fredrik Klingwall – keyboard
Jimmy Mattsson – bass guitar
Lawrence Dinamarca – drums

References

External links
 

2012 albums
Loch Vostok albums